Frederick Leslie Estabrooks (October 16, 1876 – January 31, 1974) was a Canadian politician. He served in the Legislative Assembly of New Brunswick as member of the Liberal party representing Westmorland County from 1921 to 1925.

References

20th-century Canadian politicians
1876 births
1974 deaths
New Brunswick Liberal Association MLAs